Hettie Simmons Love (born October 29, 1922) is the first African-American to earn a Master of Business Administration (MBA) degree from the Wharton School of the University of Pennsylvania.

Born in Jacksonville, Florida in 1922, Hettie Simmons Love attended Fisk University and graduated in 1943. She then attended Penn's Wharton School, graduating with her MBA on June 18, 1947.  A 2017 article in the Wharton Magazine described her as a “trailblazer” who “open[ed] the door for both minorities and women in the study of business management.”  She recalled that she was only Black student at Wharton when she attended, and one of only two women in her class, but found colleagues among three Jewish male classmates who invited her to join their study group.  

The black sorority, Alpha Kappa Alpha, which she joined at Fisk University in 1941, honored her at their Atlanta convention in 2016.  The Wharton School honored her later that year at its annual Whitney M. Young Conference, in December 2016.

Hettie Simmons married George Hayward Love, Sr., who received Bachelor's, Master's, and PhD degrees from the University of Pennsylvania and who became the first African-American employed as a high school teacher in the Philadelphia school system.  The Loves later moved to Harrisburg, Pennsylvania, where George Love supervised the desegregation of schools, and where they raised their children, George H. Love, Jr. and Karen.  Hettie Simmons Love was married to George Love for sixty-six years at the time of his death in 2014.

Hettie Simmons Love turned 100 in October 2022.

References 

1922 births
Living people
Fisk University alumni
Wharton School of the University of Pennsylvania alumni
African-American women in business
21st-century African-American people
20th-century African-American people
20th-century African-American women
21st-century African-American women
African-American centenarians
Women centenarians